The Echoes Tour (also known as Echoes Live) is the fifth headlining tour by English recording artist, Will Young. The tour supported his fifth studio album, Echoes. Beginning October 2011, the tour played 24 shows in the United Kingdom and Ireland. Additional shows were added in 2012, with Young performing at various outdoors events.

Background
The tour was announced on 4 July 2011 via newsletter from Young's team. During an interview on Loose Women, the singer stated he chose to play intimate venues on the tour as opposed to his normal arena shows. The tour commenced on 27 October 2011 at the Oasis Leisure Centre in Swindon, Wales. While on tour, a YouTube channel, Echoestourdiaries was created by bandmember Adam Wakeman. The channel features seven behind the scenes videos of the tour, shot with an iPhone. The first round of dates concluded on 26 November 2011 at St David's Hall in Cardiff, Wales.  On 12 December 2011, Young gave an exclusive performance at the famed London Palladium. The show was to celebrate the success of the album with his fans. Following the performance, additional dates were added for the summer of 2012. Dubbed the Echoes Forestry Tour, Young played six concerts for the Forestry Commission's annual music event. Commenting on the extension, Young stated: "The forest gigs have a great reputation for their atmosphere so I'm really looking forward to performing my songs in such unique settings". Additional festival shows and inmate gigs were added for June and July 2012. The staging for the 2012 shows featured a backdrop of various clothing items.

Opening acts
Jodie Marie (select shows)
Lawson (select shows—2011)
Nerina Pallot (select shows—2012)

Setlist

{{hidden
| headercss = background: #ccccff; font-size: 100%; width: 65%;
| contentcss = text-align: left; font-size: 100%; width: 75%;
| header = 2012
| content =
"Runaway"
"Come On"
"Changes"
"Hearts on Fire"
"Losing Myself"
"Who Am I"
"You and I"
"AMY" 
"Running Up That Hill" 
"All Time Love"
"Light My Fire"
"Your Game"
"Grace"
"Switch It On"
"Leave Right Now"
Encore
"Silent Valentine"
"Jealousy"
"You Don't Know"
}}

Tour dates

Festivals and other miscellaneous performances

Box office score data

Critical reception
The tour received positive reviews from music critics in England and Wales. Daniel Bonnington (Nottingham Post) wrote of the Nottingham show, "While some talent show winners, including Steve Brookstein, Shayne Ward and Leon Jackson have disappeared, this shy lad turned pop prince showed why he's still here, 10 years on". For the concert at the O2 Apollo Manchester, Liam Buckley (Virgin RedRoom) stated, "Attending the gig at the O2 Apollo in Manchester brought me to realise his purely unique sound, one that can be easily enjoyed by anybody. I was quite impressed by his ability to remain calm and composed during his performance and despite the increasing sound of the instruments surrounding him, he never feels the need to scream and shout".

Mark Drew (Express & Star) viewed the Birmingham concert at the O2 Academy Birmingham. He writes, "This Pop Idol is all about the voice, which was good a decade ago and is just incredible now. There were plenty of upbeat moments as Young performed tracks from his more dancy album Echoes, especially the finale single 'Jealousy'". In London, James Lachno (The Daily Telegraph) gave the show at the O2 Shepherd's Bush Empire four out of five stars. He says, "Dressed head to toe in black, Young seemed relaxed and confident in the new sound, while his controlled, pitch-perfect quiver eased comfortably into third gear. It was sedate but impressive, prioritising rhythm and mood, and felt well suited to the intimate stage at the O2 Empire. On his final song, the recent single 'Jealousy', Young came closest to marrying an explosive vocal with his designs on pop experimentation. While for now he is a very fine pop performer, one suspects it is this heady union that may yet bear the sweetest fruit".

For the final 2011 show in Cardiff, The Western Mail stated, "enduring success from the manufactured world of musical celebs|Fortunately the songs from Echoes are good; especially 'I Just Want a Lover' and 'Hearts on Fire' although I would have preferred a few more of the back catalogue of hits—he could probably have done all the chart songs plus plenty from the new album".

The good reviews continued for the forestry shows in 2012. For the concert at the Sherwood Forest, Megan Pengelly (Retford Trader and Guardian) writes, "Young gave a relentlessly energetic performance, transforming even the slowest of ballads into moments which filled the forest with atmosphere. Young was a capable host, interacting with fans and leaving the stage to perform closer to the crowd. If concert-goers left unsatisfied, it was only at the fact Young did not perform all of his numerous feel good hits". At the Bedgebury National Pinetum, Lynn Cox (Kent Online) stated, There is absolutely nothing negative to say about the gig, the beautiful venue, which was superbly managed and organised, is perfect for a performer like Will.The atmosphere was electric—the trickery and lighting on stage was fantastic—the whole gig and evening was just magical".

At Dalby Forest, The Scarborough News reported, "The highlights are plentiful, with an energetic "Switch It On", a soothing "All Time Love", a show-stopping Leave Right Now and the two nods to his Pop Idol days, "Light My Fire" and "Evergreen", showcasing his musical evolution. Many more reality TV 'stars' are sure to come and go over the next decade but the smart money would be on Young outlasting them all".

External links
Will Young Official Website

References

2011 concert tours
2012 concert tours